Maria Christopher Byrski is a polish diplomat, Indologist and Sanskrit scholar. He has been to poland envoy to India in the past. He was awarded the Padma Shri, the fourth highest civilian award in India for his work in Sanskrit, Indology, in 2022.

References 

Living people
Year of birth missing (living people)